Fran McKee (September 13, 1926 – March 3, 2002) was the first female line officer to hold the rank of Rear Admiral in the United States Navy.  She was promoted to the rank of Rear Admiral (Lower Half) on June 1, 1976 and earned her second star in November 1978.  Rear Admiral McKee was one of the first two women selected to attend the Naval War College, and was the first woman to command  an activity of the Naval Security Group Command.

Rear Admiral McKee retired from the Navy in 1981, and died on March 3, 2002, aged 75, after suffering a cerebral hemorrhage; she was buried with full military honors at Arlington National Cemetery on April 8, 2002. A reception was held in the Women in Military Service for America Memorial at Arlington, Virginia.  She was inducted into the Alabama Women's Hall of Fame in 2007.

Military biography
McKee was born in Florence, Alabama. She was commissioned as ensign on December 4, 1950, and spent the next four years in the Office of Naval Research as Assistant to the Director, Physical Science Division, and then as Administrative Aide to the Chief of Naval Research. In May 1954 she became Women Procurement Officer at Navy Recruiting Station and Office of Naval Officer Procurement in Boston, Massachusetts.

After attending the General Line School, U.S. Naval Postgraduate School, Monterey, California, in September 1957 she was appointed Personnel Officer at Naval Air Station Port Lyautey, Morocco. From September 1958 she was Training Coordinator at the Damage Control School, Treasure Island, San Francisco, California.
 
McKee then served as Classification/Mobilization Officer on the Staff of the Chief of Naval Air Reserve Training from January 1962; as Officer-in-Charge of the Naval Women Officers School, Newport, Rhode Island, from June 1965; and as Personnel Officer at Naval Station Rota, Spain, from October 1967.

In August 1969 McKee reported to the Naval War College in Newport, Rhode Island, as one of the first two women selected to attend the regular curriculum, graduating in June 1970.

She was then appointed Head of the Special Inquiries and Publication Section, Officer Distribution Division of the Bureau of Naval Personnel in June 1970, and served as Deputy Assistant Chief of Naval Personnel for Human Goals from September 1972.

From September 1973 to May 1976, with the rank of captain, McKee commanded the Naval Security Group Activity at Fort George G. Meade, Maryland. She was the first woman assigned to head an activity of the Naval Security Group Command.

In February 1976, McKee became the first woman line officer to be selected for flag rank. From June 1, 1976, with the rank of rear admiral (lower half), she was Director of Naval Education Development at the Naval Education and Training Command, Pensacola, Florida, and from June 1, 1978, Assistant Chief of Naval Personnel for Human Resource Management with additional duty as Assistant Deputy Chief of Naval Operations (Human Resource Management). She received promotion to rear admiral (upper half) in November 1978.

McKee retired from the Navy in 1981.

Education
McKee graduated with a degree in chemistry from the University of Alabama in 1950.  She graduated from the Naval Line Officer's School, the Naval Postgraduate School and the Naval War College. McKee earned a master's degree in International Affairs from George Washington University, Washington, D.C. in 1970. McKee also received an honorary doctorate in public administration from the Massachusetts Maritime Academy.

See also

 Women in the United States Navy
 List of female United States military generals and flag officers

References

Arlington National Cemetery
An Act to name the bridge spanning Duck River on U.S. Highway 43 in Maury County, Tennessee in honor of the late Rear Admiral Fran McKee, United States Navy (Retired)
Biographical sketch prepared for induction into the Alabama Academy of Honor
Alabama Women's Hall of Fame

1926 births
2002 deaths
People from Florence, Alabama
United States Navy rear admirals (upper half)
University of Alabama alumni
Recipients of the Legion of Merit
Naval Postgraduate School alumni
Female admirals of the United States Navy
People from Annandale, Virginia
Burials at Arlington National Cemetery
20th-century American women
20th-century American people